Astin Dar-e Sofla (also Romanized as Āstīn Dar-e Soflá; also known as Āstīn Dar-e Pā'īn and Āstīn Darreh) is a village in Ilat-e Qaqazan-e Gharbi Rural District, Kuhin District, Qazvin County, Qazvin Province, Iran. At the 2006 census, its population was 56, in 15 families.

References 

Populated places in Qazvin County